Anime Candide is a 2003 album by Daniele Sepe.

Track listing
All songs by Sepe unless noted

 "'Ndunielle"
 "Il Lupo E l'Agnelle"
 "Anime Candide" (Lacobeli, Sepe)
 "Ce Me Pe Ti Zog?"
 "Valse Pour Marlene"
 "Sammuchella" (Ririani)
 "Amuri"
 "Valse Bomba"
 "Preludio" (Ricci)
 "Canson d'Amour" (Iacobelli, Sepe)
 "L' Uccello de Fuocco"
 "Asi Como Matan los Negros" (Neruda, Ortega)
 "Ronda da Marraficas" (Afonso)
 "Menina Estas a Janela" (Vitorino)
 "Happy End"

References

2003 albums
Daniele Sepe albums